Sphingomonas mucosissima  is a Gram-negative and non-motile bacteria from the genus of Sphingomonas which has been isolated from soil crusts from the Colorado Plateau in the United States.

References

Further reading

External links
Type strain of Sphingomonas mucosissima at BacDive -  the Bacterial Diversity Metadatabase

mucosissima
Bacteria described in 2007